The School of Diplomacy and International Relations (SODIR),  is a post-secondary, degree-granting institution concentrating on international affairs within Seton Hall University in South Orange, New Jersey.  Founded in collaboration with the United Nations Association of the United States of America, it was the first school of international relations to be founded after the Cold War.  The school offers both undergraduate and graduate programs. The School of Diplomacy and International Relations is an affiliate member of the Association of Professional Schools of International Affairs.

History
The school was founded in 1997, and welcomed its first class in the Fall of 1998. Among the founding members was its first dean, Ambassador Clay Constantinou, a former U.S. diplomat and graduate of Seton Hall Law. The school was later named in honor of retired Goldman Sachs executive and philanthropist John C. Whitehead, who served as deputy secretary of state under President Ronald Reagan from 1985–89; Whitehead also headed the United Nations Association of the United States of America and was the Chairman of the Lower Manhattan Development Corporation. As the first school of international relations in the post–Cold War era, the Whitehead School was founded with a need to “prepare the next generation of global leaders.”  
The School's founding was supported by the United Nations Association of the United States of America, with which it still enjoys a close relationship. Its close proximity to New York City has also historically allowed its students and faculty to participate in U.N.-sponsored functions. Consequently, students from the school often interact with U.N. diplomats. The alliance with UNA-USA has also afforded students opportunities to receive internships and employment with various organizations of the U.N.

In June 2013, it was announced that John C. Whitehead asked for his name to be removed from the school. Dr. Andrea Bartoli, an international conflict resolution expert who has served in academic and diplomatic positions for more than two decades, joined the School as Dean in July 2013. Under his leadership the School launched three new academic and research centers in the spring of 2014: The Center for United Nations and Global Governance Studies, The Center for Peace and Conflict Studies, and The Center for Emerging Powers and Transnational Trends. These new centers are in addition to the Center for Global Health Studies.

Degree programs
The School offers both undergraduate and graduate degrees, a Bachelor of Science and Master of Arts in Diplomacy and International Relations, as well as an Executive M.S. in International Affairs, available in on-campus, online, and hybrid formats. It also offers Graduate Certificates in Post-Conflict State Reconstruction and Sustainability (online), United Nations Studies, Global Health Management, and Global Studies for both working professionals as well as matriculated graduate students, and a United Nations Intensive Summer Study Program for graduate students, advanced undergraduates and working professionals. The UN program may be taken as a three credit course for credit or not for credit. In addition to its formal academic programs, the school is often a venue for professional workshops and conferences.

Undergraduate
The undergraduate program, working toward a Bachelor of Science degree, is an intensive program which includes 120 total credits, 45 of which are Diplomacy specific coursework. Students take a wide range of courses in international relations, history, economics, and law. In addition, there is an eighteen-credit foreign language requirement which usually leads to the completion of a minor. As part of the curriculum, all undergraduate students complete at least one internship for academic credit. A B.S./M.A. program is offered for students who wish to complete a master's degree in an accelerated time frame. A six year B.S./J.D. program prepares students for both an undergraduate degree in International Relations and a law degree.

Graduate
Students enrolled in the M.A. program participate in a two-year program that culminates with either a research project or a thesis. Degree requirements include the completion of an academic internship and at least two of thirteen different specializations. Students choose between functional fields of study such as: 
International Economics and Development,
Foreign Policy Analysis,
International Law and Human Rights,
International Organizations,
Global Negotiation and Conflict Management,
Global Health and Human Security,
International security,
Post-Conflict State Reconstruction and Sustainability

Regional specializations include:
Africa
Asia
Europe
Latin America and the Caribbean
Middle East

Students can also design their own fields of study. Each specialization consists of three or four different courses. All students have to satisfactorily complete 45 credits. In addition, with the school's emphasis on building a strong economics background, all students have to complete a series of courses in economics.

To complement the M.A. degree, the School also offers several dual-degree programs in collaboration with other academic units of the university. These include:
 M.A./J.D. with the Seton Hall University Law School
 M.A./M.B.A. with the Stillman School of Business
 M.A./M.P.A. with the College of Arts and Sciences's Political Science department
 M.A./M.A. in Asian Studies with the College of Arts and Sciences's Asian Studies department
 M.A./M.A. in Strategic Communication with the Seton Hall University College of Communication and the Arts

In addition to these programs, the School also offers a ten course Executive M.S. in International Affairs for mid-career professionals, available in on-campus, online, and hybrid formats. Graduate Certificates are offered in Post-Conflict State Reconstruction and Sustainability (online), United Nations Studies, Global Health Management, and Global Studies.

Experiential Learning Programs 
Internships are an integral part of the School as they allow students to get first-hand experience working in the international relations field and to apply what they learned in their classes to current events. Undergraduate students are required to complete at least two internships and graduate students are required to complete at least one internship prior to graduating. Students at the School have interned at ABC News, American Civil Liberties Union, Amnesty International, BBC, Caritas Internationalis, Council on Foreign Relations, Doctors Without Borders, Human Rights Watch, International Rescue Committee, Interpol, New York Times, U.S. Fund for UNICEF, U.S. Department of State, various missions to the United Nations, and at the offices of mayors, congressmen and women, and senators.

Both undergraduate and graduate students have the opportunity to spend a semester in Washington, D.C. as part of the School's collaboration with the United Nations Foundation. While there, they take seminar-style classes and examine the causes, consequences and possible solutions to today's global policy challenges. Students are placed in competitive Washington, D.C. based internships while maintaining their financial aid and full-time student status.

The School also offers study seminars in China, Cyprus, Ethiopia, and Kosovo. Each trip offers an intensive study of international affairs where students see international relations theory and practice come together. In these courses, students are immersed in political, social, economic and cultural issues as a diplomatic delegation.

Students of all majors can participate in both the semester in Washington, D.C.and study seminars.

World Leaders Forum
The School is also known for its high-profile lecturers.  The past two United Nations Secretaries-General Kofi Annan and Ban Ki-moon have both participated in the Forum, as well as Sinn Féin Leader Gerry Adams, Iranian President Mohammed Khatami, Nobel Peace Laureate John Hume, President of Israel Shimon Peres, former Soviet President Mikhail Gorbachev, Liberian peace activist and Nobel Laureate Leymah Gbowee, United States National Security Advisor Susan Rice, United States Ambassador to the United Nations Samantha Power, and most recently, the President of the 72nd United Nations General Assembly Miroslav Lajčák. Other heads of state have included former Polish President Lech Wałęsa, and former Prime Minister Tony Blair.

Journal of Diplomacy

The Journal of Diplomacy and International Relations is an internationally distributed periodical produced by the School's graduate students.

The Journal's editorial board has worked together with notable contributors such as: UN Secretary-General Kofi Annan; European Court Justice President, Gil Carlos Rodriguez Iglesias; President Oscar Arias Sánchez; Former Director-General of the World Health Organization, Gro Harlem Brundtland; Iranian President Mohammad Khatami; Deputy Secretary of U.S. Treasury Stuart Eizenstat; and Under Secretary of State Thomas Pickering.

The Journal is indexed by Columbia International Affairs Online, the International Relations and Security Network, Public Affairs Information Service, International Political Science Abstracts, America: History and Life and Historical Abstracts, and Ulrich’s Periodicals Directory.

Former Deans
Amb. John K. Menzies (2007–2013)
Rev. Paul Holmes (a.i., 2005–2007)
Amb. Clay Constantinou (1999–2005)
Terrence Blackburn (a.i., 1997–1999)

References

External links

Seton Hall University
Schools of international relations in the United States
Educational institutions established in 1997
1997 establishments in New Jersey